Franco Danilo Güity Félix (born 5 December 1987) is a Honduran footballer who plays as a forward.

References

External links
 
 

1987 births
Living people
Association football forwards
Honduran footballers
Honduran expatriate footballers
C.D. Olimpia players
Atlético Choloma players
C.D.S. Vida players
Juticalpa F.C. players
Hispano players
Lobos UPNFM players
Real C.D. España players
Al-Nojoom FC players
Bisha FC players
Saudi First Division League players
Saudi Second Division players
Honduras international footballers
Expatriate footballers in Saudi Arabia